Tough Kid is a 1938 American crime film directed by Howard Bretherton and written by Wellyn Totman. The film stars Frankie Darro, Dick Purcell, Judith Allen, Lillian Elliott, Don Rowan and William Ruhl. The film was released on December 28, 1938, by Monogram Pictures.

Plot
Skipper Murphy helps train his brother Red for a championship fight. However, a gang of gamblers tries to blackmail Red into losing by kidnapping his fiancée Ruth Lane.

Cast          
Frankie Darro as Skipper Murphy
Dick Purcell as Red Murphy
Judith Allen as Ruth Lane
Lillian Elliott as Katie Murphy
Don Rowan as Bill Grogan
William Ruhl as Monk 
Lew Kelly as Regan 
Ralph Peters as Blackie 
Max Marx as Britt 
Jean Joyce as Miss Grace 
Cliff Howell as Radio Commentator
Joe Lynch as Krause
Wilbur Mack as Doc Radford

References

External links
 

1938 films
American crime films
1938 crime films
Monogram Pictures films
Films directed by Howard Bretherton
American black-and-white films
1930s English-language films
1930s American films